Beats International were a British dance music band and hip-hop collective, formed in the late 1980s by Norman Cook (later in his career known as Fatboy Slim) based in Brighton, East Sussex, England, after his departure from the Housemartins.

A loose confederation of musicians, the line-up also included vocalist Lindy Layton, former North of Cornwallis vocalist Lester Noel, rappers DJ Baptiste (The Crazy MC), MC Wildski and keyboardist Andy Boucher. Unusually, the band's live line-up also incorporated a graffiti artist, REQ, who painted designs on a backdrop while the musicians played.

Biography
After having a few small hits under his own name such as "Blame It on the Bassline", a 1989 hip-house crossover single featuring MC Wildski, and "For Spacious Lies" with Lester Noel, Cook decided that further releases would be under the collective name "Beats International" - just one of the names he went on to use in the 1990s.

Beats International's debut studio album, Let Them Eat Bingo included these solo hits and the original version of "Won't Talk About It" which featured Billy Bragg singing in a soulful falsetto. The album also spawned the UK number-one single "Dub Be Good to Me", a re-working of the SOS Band's chart-topper "Just Be Good to Me", based on a sample of the bassline from the Clash's "Guns of Brixton". This song was the first to be credited under the Beats International name and featured sometime actor Layton on vocals.

The collective followed their number-one single with a re-recorded version of "Won't Talk About It", which replaced Billy Bragg's vocal with that of Layton and Noel, and "Burundi Blues", a track which featured samples of Bessie Jones, the Thrashing Doves and, on the album version, Brian Cant's introduction from Camberwick Green.

The second Beats International album was 1991's Excursion on the Version, which featured a greater use of dub and reggae sounds, but failed to repeat the success of its predecessor. This was the final Beats International recording, with Cook next going on to form Freak Power.

Discography

Albums

Norman Cook singles

Note: these singles are from "Let Them Eat Bingo" and would be re-credited to Beats International on this album.

Singles

Samples list
Let Them Eat Bingo
"Burundi Dub"
"Thank You for Talkin' to Me Africa" by Sly & The Family Stone / bassline
"Dub Be Good to Me"
"Just Be Good to Me" by The SOS Band
"The Guns of Brixton" by The Clash / bassline
"Blame It on the Bassline"
"Get into Something" by Isley Brothers / phrase "Come on now / give the drummer some"
"Won't Talk About It"
 "Thank You Mr. DJ" by Silver Convention / intro
 "Levi Stubbs Tears" by Billy Bragg / guitar
"Dance to the Drummer's Beat"
"Dance to the Drummer's Beat" by Herman Kelly & Life
"Tribute to King Tubby"
"Unwind Yourself" by Marva Whitney / saxophone in beginning

Excursion on the Version
"Echo Chamber"
"Could You Be Loved" by Bob Marley & The Wailers

See also
List of Number 1 Dance Hits (United States)
List of artists who reached number one on the US Dance chart

References

Further reading

Musical groups established in 1989
Musical groups disestablished in 1992
1989 establishments in England
1992 disestablishments in England
Remixers
English dance music groups
English electronic music groups
Musical groups from Brighton and Hove
Elektra Records artists
Telstar Records artists
Go! Beat artists